Saptahik Samaya (Odia:ସପ୍ତହିକ) is a weekly magazine in the Odia language published by Pradipta Kumar Lenka from Bhubaneswar, India.

See also
List of magazines in India

References

1997 establishments in Orissa
Weekly magazines published in India
Magazines established in 1997
Mass media in Bhubaneswar
Odia-language mass media